Christopher or Chris Connelly may refer to:

Christopher Connelly (1941–1988), American actor
Chris Connelly (journalist) (born 1957), American reporter for MTV News and ESPN
Chris Connelly (musician) (born 1964), Scottish guitarist, vocalist and songwriter

See also
Christopher Connolly (disambiguation)